Christopher Moretti (born November 8, 1986 in Cesena) is an Italian Grand Prix motorcycle racer.

Career statistics

By season

Races by year

References

External links
 Profile on motogp.com

Living people
1986 births
Italian motorcycle racers
250cc World Championship riders
People from Cesena
Supersport World Championship riders
Sportspeople from the Province of Forlì-Cesena